The 1929–30 Clarkson Golden Knights men's ice hockey season was the 10th season of play for the program. The team was coached by Jack Roos in his 1st season.

Season
After three consecutive seasons being one of the best teams in the country, Clarkson had to contend with serious problems at the start of the season. In August, captain-elect William Harrison Heintzman was suffering from a throat infection and had an operation to address the condition. He appeared to recover after surgery and began to train for his senior season but began experiencing complications. His condition worsened and he deteriorated, dying on August 21 at the age of 25. While that tragedy unfolded, the team also had to deal with the loss of Professor Gordon Croskery, the team's head coach, who had left the college after the previous season. Harry Hodge, the school's assistant coach of athletics, was put in charge of the team until a permanent replacement was found. Jack Roos was eventually hired for the job and had a tough task to lead the team after Heintzman death.

In Heintzman's memory, no captain was named for the year and the team did well to soldier on. After several exhibition wins in Canada, Clarkson opened the season in Ottawa and played a raucous game against Ashbury, winning 9–6. Upon returning home, the defense recovered its typical form and the team shutout Loyola 2–0. Warm weather forced a game with MIT on the 10th of January to be rescheduled for early February. After dropping a Ashbury college in a mid-January rematch, the team headed on a trip south. They sandwiched two overwhelming victories around a close loss to Princeton, ending Tech's 10-game winning streak. 

Soft ice against forced the postponement of a game, this time the tilt against St. Lawrence was moved from January 28th until mid-February. Rink conditions improved well enough for the match against McGill to take place. Entering the contest, the Redmen were one of the top teams in Canada and were expected to be a tough challenge for the Knights. 1,500 fans shoed up to Ives Park to watch Tech roll over the visitors and earn their sixth win on the season. Three days later, the team performed a similar feat against the weaker team from MIT and notched their fourth shutout of the season. At the end of the week, Clarkson travelled down to New Haven to take on the top team in the nation, Yale. Tech was able to keep the game close in the first period, but the Elis dominated the second and then closed down all avenues of attack in the final frame. The 1–5loss signaled that Clarkson still had a ways to go before they could compete for a national championship.

The Knights ended their season at home against bitter rival St. Lawrence, demolishing the Saints with a 17–0 victory. Even without the normal center Williams, it was both the most goals scored and largest margin of victory for Tech in the ten years of the program's existence. Wally Easton needed to only make 3 saves in his fifth shutout on the year while 'Peck' Donald and Clarence 'Ike' Houston led the offense to a triumphant win. 

Kenneth Armin served as team manager for the season.

Roster

Standings

Schedule and results

|-
!colspan=12 style=";" | Regular Season

† Clarkson's records list three different final scores for the game: 9–6, 8–4 (against 'Roxbury') and 8–1.
‡ Penn reported the score of the game as 12–0.

References

Clarkson Golden Knights men's ice hockey seasons
Clarkson
Clarkson
Clarkson
Clarkson